Verkhnenikolskoye is a rural locality (a village) in Askinsky Selsoviet, Askinsky District, Bashkortostan, Russia. The population was 9 as of 2010. There is 1 street.

Geography 
Verkhnenikolskoye is located 29 km north of Askino (the district's administrative centre) by road. Tyuysk is the nearest rural locality.

References 

Rural localities in Askinsky District